Total F.C. is a football team from Djibouti City, Djibouti. The team has never won the Djibouti Cup.

Notes  

Football clubs in Djibouti